Long is a district (amphoe) in the western part of Phrae province, northern Thailand.

Geography
Neighboring districts are (from the north clockwise) Song, Nong Muang Khai, Mueang Phrae, Sung Men, Den Chai, and Wang Chin of Phrae province; Mae Tha and Mae Mo of Lampang province.

The Phi Pan Nam Mountains dominate the landscape of the district. Doi Pha Klong National Park is in Long district.

Administration
The district is divided into nine sub-districts (tambons), which are further subdivided into 89 villages (mubans). There are two townships (thesaban tambons), Ban Pin and Huai O, both covering parts of the same-named tambon. There are a further nine tambon administrative organizations (TAO).

External links
amphoe.com (Thai)
Doi Pha Klong National Park

Long